Eros Now is a subscription based over the top, video on-demand Indian entertainment and media platform, launched in 2012 by Eros International plc. The network offers media streaming and video-on-demand services.

Movies

Web series

Upcoming

Eros Now Quickie
 Date Gone Wrong
 Paise Fek Tamasha Dekh
The Investigation
Tumse Na Ho Payega

Other programs

Animated series

Genre-based series

Others
Eros Now Vibes
 Bollywood Vines
 Eros Now E-buzz
 Eros Now Black and White (Original Interview Series)
Eros Now Lists
Feel Good
Eros Now Bollywood

References

External links
Eros Now official website
Complete List of Eros Now Originals & Eros Now Web Series

Eros Now original films
Eros Now